Keshvari is a surname. Notable people with the surname include:

 Ahmad Keshvari (1953–1980), Iranian helicopter pilot
 Mazyar Keshvari (born 1981), Iranian-Norwegian politician
 Mostafa Keshvari, Canadian filmmaker

See also
 Keshvari Expressway, in Isfahan
 Keshvari Rural District, Ilam Province of Iran